Mount Brew is a mountain located  south of Lillooet and  north of Skihist Mountain in south-central British Columbia, Canada. It lies on the western side of the Fraser River and is the third-highest mountain of the Lillooet Ranges, after Skihist Mountain and Petlushkwohap Mountain in the Cantilever Range to the west of Lytton.

The mountain was named in 1859 by Lt. Mayne for Chartres Brew, a police officer and judge in the Colony of British Columbia.

References

Brew
Brew